Podolobium scandens, commonly known as netted shaggy-pea, is a flowering plant in the family Fabaceae and is endemic to eastern Australia. It is a prostrate, small shrub with orange-yellow pea-like flowers and red markings.

Description

Taxonomy and naming
The species was first described in 1805 by James Edward Smith and given the name Chorizema scandens.  In 1825 Augustin Pyramus de Candolle changed the name to Podolobium scandens and the description was published in Prodromus Systematis Naturalis Regni Vegetabilis.

Distribution and habitat
Netted shaggy-pea grows in rocky clay soils in sclerophyll forests on ranges and coastal situations north of Bodalla in New South Wales.

References

Fabales of Australia
Flora of New South Wales
Flora of Queensland
scandens
Plants described in 1825
Taxa named by Augustin Pyramus de Candolle